Veena Kuppayyar   (1798–1860) was an exponent of Veena and a composer of Carnatic music. He was a student of the famous composer Tyagaraja. Kuppayar composed his songs in Telugu language and has left behind a number of popular kritis.

Early life

Veena Kuppayya was born in a Telugu Brahmin family in Tiruvottiyur, near Chennai. His father Sambamoorti Sastri was a famous vocalist as well as a veena player. Kuppayyar had his initial training from his father. Later he continued his musical training under Tyagaraja and learnt the art of music composition from him. Following the steps of his guru, Kuppaiyer has composed two groups of Pancharathnams – Kālahasti Pancharathna kritis and Vénkatésha Pancharathna kritis. The Panchrathna kritis are in Telugu and bears his nom de plume “Gópāla-dāsa” – his family deity, Sri Venugopala Swamy. These Panchrathna kritis also have been bedecked with  beautiful Chittaswarams  - solfa passages.

Kuppayyar later moved to Chennai and sought the patronage of the local ruler Kovur Sundara Mudaliar. Kuppayyar trained a lot of disciples, who carried forward the legacy of Tyagaraja, helping to spread his krithis. Veena Kuppayar was a talented veena player. He also learnt the violin, a new instrument to Carnatic Music at that time. He composed many varnams and krithis in particular. The most famous varnam was Sami Ninne in Shankarabharanam. When he was in his height of composing, he received the title of Asthana Vidwan.

Compositions

See also

List of Carnatic composers

External links 
 Carnatica.net

Carnatic composers
1798 births
1860 deaths
Saraswati veena players
People from Tiruvottiyur